Tara Rushton (born 2 July 1984) is an Australian sports presenter and journalist. Rushton previously presented the association football series Kick Off and Sunday Shootout on Fox Sports Australia as well as appearing on Fox Sports News.

Early life
Born in Perth, Rushton grew up on the Mornington Peninsula in Victoria, before moving to Sydney where she attended school at Oakhill College.  She then completed a Diploma in Journalism and a Bachelor of Arts at Macleay College, majoring in Media and Communications. She moved to London at the age of 18.

Career
In 2010, Rushton moved to Singapore and took on a television presenting role on Singtel TV's Mio Stadium channel. She hosted the English Premier League-focused Tiger Goals on Sunday series.

In 2013, Rushton moved home to Australia and replaced the departing Mel McLaughlin on Fox Sports. As well as presenting match broadcasts of the A-League, English Premier League and Socceroos matches, she also began presenting the network's weekly A-League wrap show, Sunday Shootout, alongside, as of 2016, Mark Bosnich, John Kosmina and Ned Zelic. When not hosting from the studio, she is also often used as a sideline reporter in matches that Fox Sports presents.

In 2015, Rushton was nominated for an ASTRA award, for Most Outstanding Female Presenter.

According to The Daily Telegraph Rushton is set to co-anchor a UFC Tonight style show for Fox Sports on Australian pay television network Foxtel called UFC Fight Week that premiered on Thursday, 16 April 2015

In October 2021 Rushton join Network 10 Sport Football Commentary Team for All the A-Leagues, Matildas, Socceroos and FFA Cup matches as a sports presenter.

Personal life
Rushton is mixed-race, being half-Anglo-Celtic Australian (through her father) and half-Burmese (through her mother). She is an avid Arsenal F.C. fan, having previously lived in Islington in North London, near Arsenal's home ground. Her favourite player is Thierry Henry. She has also played local football herself, for Lindfield F.C. on Sydney's North Shore. In January 2016, she started dating former National Rugby League player Cooper Cronk. They married on 14 December 2017. They have two sons, born in 2018 and 2021.

References

External links 

 

1984 births
Living people
Australian people of Burmese descent
Australian soccer commentators
Australian television presenters
Australian women television presenters
Fox Sports (Australian TV network) people
People from Perth, Western Australia
Rugby league players wives and girlfriends
People educated at Oakhill College